In Indian religions and society, an acharya (Sanskrit: आचार्य,; Pali: ācariya) is a preceptor and expert instructor in matters such as religion, or any other subject. An acharya is a highly learned person with a title affixed to the names of learned subject. The designation has different meanings in Hinduism, Buddhism and secular contexts. 

Acharya is sometimes used to address an expert teacher or a scholar in any discipline, e.g.: Bhaskaracharya, the expert mathematician.

Etymology
The Sanskrit phrase Acharam Grahayati Acharam Dadati Iti Va means Acharya (or teacher) is the one who teaches good conduct to one's students. A female teacher is called an achāryā, and a male teacher's wife is called an achāryāni

In Hinduism
In Hinduism, an acharya is a formal title of a teacher or guru, who has attained a degree in Veda and Vedanga.

Prominent acharyas in the  Hindu tradition are as given below :
Adi Sankaracharya
Ramanujacharya
Madhvacharya
Nimbarkacharya 
Vallabhacharya
Chaitanya Mahaprabhu
Acharya Sandipani

Buddhism
In Buddhism, an ācārya (Pali: ācariya) is a senior teacher or master. In Theravada it is sometimes used as a title of address for Buddhist monks who have passed ten vassas. In Thai, the term is ajahn, and in Japanese it is ajari. 

In Vajrayana Buddhism, tantric masters are known as vajrācāryas (Tibetan: dorje lopön; Jp. “kongō ajari” 金剛阿闍梨).

In Jainism

In Jainism, an acharya is the highest leader of a Jain order. Acharya is one of the Pañca-Parameṣṭhi (five supreme beings) and thus worthy of worship. They are the final authority in the monastic order and has the authority to ordain new monks and nuns. They are also authorized to consecrate new idols, although this authority is sometimes delegated to scholars designated by them.

An acharya, like any other Jain monk, is expected to wander except for the Chaturmas. Bhaṭṭārakas, who head institutions, are technically junior monks, and thus permitted to stay in the same place.

In scientific/mathematical scholarship
 Bhaskaracharya
 Mahaviracharya
 Bhaskaracharya I

Acharya (degree)
In Sanskrit institutions, acharya is a post-graduate degree.

See also
 Srikanta Acharya

References

External links

Scriptural References to 'acharya'
Jain Monks, Statesmen and Aryikas Dr. K. C. Jain

 
Titles and occupations in Hinduism
Buddhist titles
Buddhist religious occupations
Swaminarayan Sampradaya
Sanskrit words and phrases
Titles in India
History of education in India
Jain religious occupations